Stanisław Zuber (born October 14, 1883 in Lviv; died 1947) was a Polish geologist, specialist in the geology of oil deposits, as well as the regional and raw geology of Albania.

References

20th-century Polish geologists
1883 births
1947 deaths
Scientists from Lviv